(Also known as Semut Penggigit Bujur in Indonesia) is a children's song in Japan that broke into the top 10 singles charts. The music video and song were created by the husband and wife duo Uruma Delvi.

Overview 
The song first appeared in 2007 on Minna no Uta, a Japanese TV program that targets children and is broadcast on Nippon Hōsō Kyōkai.  "Oshiri Kajiri Mushi" means "[a] butt-biting bug" in Japanese, and the songwriters describe the protagonist as a magical bug that encourages people to interact with each other by biting their bottoms.

Anime television series 

A children's anime television series, produced by Kinema Citrus, is broadcast on NHK and simulcast by Crunchyroll. The main role, 10 year old bug called Oshiri Kajiri Mushi XVIII, is voiced by Tomoko Kaneda.

References

External links 
 Oshiri Kajiri Mushi Official Website 
 

2012 anime television series debuts
2007 singles
Fictional insects
Japanese children's songs
Japanese-language songs
Kinema Citrus
2007 songs